Julia Domna (– 217 AD) was Roman empress from 193 to 211 as the wife of Emperor Septimius Severus. She was the first empress of the Severan dynasty. Domna was born in Emesa (present-day Homs) in Roman Syria to an Arab family of priests of the deity Elagabalus. In 187, she married Severus, who at the time was governor of the Roman province of Gallia Lugdunensis. They had two sons, Caracalla and Geta. A civil war over the Roman throne broke out in 193, and shortly afterwards Severus declared himself emperor. The war ended in 197 with the defeat of the last of Severus's opponents.

As empress, Domna was famous for her political, social, and philosophical influence. She received titles such as "Mother of the Invincible Camps". After the elder of her sons, Caracalla, started ruling with his father, she was briefly co-empress with Caracalla's wife, Fulvia Plautilla, until the latter fell into disgrace. Following the death of Severus in 211, Domna became the first empress dowager to receive the title combination "Pia Felix Augusta", which may have implied greater powers being vested in her than what was usual for a Roman empress mother. Her sons succeeded to the throne. They had a conflictual relationship and Domna acted as their mediator, but Caracalla had his brother Geta assassinated later that year. 

Domna committed suicide in 217 upon hearing of Caracalla's assassination in the course of his campaign against Parthia, on which she had accompanied him to Antioch (present-day Antakya, Turkey). After the death of Domna, her older sister Julia Maesa successfully restored the Severan dynasty to power in 218.

Family background 
Julia Domna was born in Emesa (modern day Homs) in Syria around 160 AD
to an Arab family that was part of the Emesan dynasty. Her name, Domna, is an archaic Arabic word meaning "black", referencing the nature of the sun god Elagabalus which took the form of a black stone. She was the youngest daughter of the high priest of Baal, Julius Bassianus, and sister to Julia Maesa. Through Maesa and her husband Julius Avitus, Domna had two nieces: Julia Soaemias and Julia Mamaea, the respective mothers of future Roman emperors Elagabalus and Severus Alexander.

Domna's ancestors were priest kings of the temple of Elagabalus. The family had enormous wealth and was promoted to Roman senatorial aristocracy. Before her marriage, Domna inherited the estate of her paternal great-uncle Julius Agrippa, a former leading centurion.

Marriage 
The Augustan History, a generally unreliable source, relates that, after losing his first wife around 186, politician Septimius Severus heard a foretelling of a woman in Syria who would marry a king. So Severus sought her as his wife. This woman was Domna. Bassianus accepted Severus' marriage proposal in early 187, and in the summer the couple married in Lugdunum (modern-day Lyon, France), of which Severus was the governor. The marriage proved happy, and Severus cherished Domna and her political opinions. Domna built "the most splendid reputation" by applying herself to letters and philosophy. She gave birth to their two sons, Lucius Septimius Bassianus (Caracalla) in 188 in Lugdunum, and Publius Septimius Geta the following year in Rome.

Civil war

After the Roman emperor Commodus was murdered without an heir in 192, many contenders rushed for the throne, including Domna's husband Severus. An elder senator, Pertinax, was appointed by the Praetorian Guard as the new emperor of Rome. But when Pertinax would not meet the Guard's demands, he too was murdered. Another politician, Didius Julianus, was called to Rome and appointed emperor. Severus, coming from the north into Rome, overthrew Julianus and had him executed. 

Severus claimed the title of emperor in 193. By offering Clodius Albinus, a powerful governor of Britannia, the rank of Caesar (successor), Severus could focus on his other rival to the throne, Pescennius Niger, whom he defeated at the Battle of Issus in 194. When afterwards Severus openly declared his son Caracalla as his successor, Clodius Albinus was hailed emperor by his troops. At the Battle of Lugdunum in 197, Severus defeated and killed Albinus, establishing himself as Emperor. Thus, Domna became Empress consort.

Power and influence 

Unlike most imperial wives, Domna remarkably accompanied her husband on his military campaigns and stayed in camp with the army. As worded by Barbara Levick, Domna "was to exceed all other empresses in the number and variety of her official titles." Honorary titles were granted to Domna similar to those given to Faustina the Younger, including "Mother of the Invincible Camps", and Mater Augustus (Mother of Augustus). She was respected and viewed positively for most of her tenure, as indicated by coins minted with her portrait that mention her titles or simply refer to her as "Julia Augusta". The title Pia Felix Augusta which she received after Severus' death was "perhaps a way of implying that Domna had absorbed and was continuing her husband's attributes" after his death.

Several medallions for Domna were issued by Severus as early as 207, on the reverses of which is "Vesta Mater" (Mother Vesta), which, according to Molly M. Lindner, "could refer to an invocation to Vesta during prayers and supplications that the Vestal Virgins made whenever they prayed publicly". According to Lindner,

Transition of power 

When Severus died in 211 in Eboracum (York), Domna became the mediator between their two sons, Caracalla and Geta, who were supposed to rule as joint emperors, according to their father's wishes expressed in his will. However, the two young men had a discordant relationship, and Geta was murdered by Caracalla's soldiers in December of the same year. Geta's name was then removed from inscriptions and his image erased as the result of a damnatio memoriae. As explained by Caillan Davenport:

Death 
In 217, Caracalla began a new war with Parthia. Domna went with Caracalla as far as Antioch. There she stayed, helping to deal with his correspondence, while he went on to the frontier. During the campaign, Caracalla was assassinated by a Roman soldier. Domna chose to commit suicide after hearing about the rebellion, perhaps a decision hastened by the fact that she was suffering from breast cancer, as well as a reluctance to return to private life. Her sister, Julia Maesa restored the Severan dynasty in 218. Domna's body was brought to Rome and placed in the Sepulcrum C. et L. Caesaris (perhaps a separate chamber in the Mausoleum of Augustus). Later, however, both her bones and those of Geta were transferred by Maesa to the Mausoleum of Hadrian.

Legacy 
Domna is remembered for having encouraged Philostratus to write the Life of Apollonius of Tyana. Domna is thought to have died before Philostratus could finish his work of eight volumes. She also influenced Roman fashion: the hairstyle that she used would later be worn by Roman empress Cornelia Salonina and Palmyran queen Zenobia. Domna seems to have made the wearing of wigs, a custom of Assyrians, popular among Romans.

Severan dynasty family tree

Notes

References

Sources

Further reading 

160 births
217 deaths
Ancient Roman women in warfare
Ancient Romans who committed suicide
Arabs in the Roman Empire
Deified Roman empresses
People from Homs
Emesene dynasty
Domna
Severan dynasty
People of Roman Syria
2nd-century Roman empresses
3rd-century Roman empresses
2nd-century Arabs
3rd-century Arabs
Damnatio memoriae
Women in 2nd-century warfare
Family of Septimius Severus
Burials at the Castel Sant'Angelo